Drugs is a peer-reviewed medical journal published by Adis International (Springer Nature) that covers topics in drugs and therapeutics. Besides research articles, the journal also publishes "Adis Drug Evaluations and AdisInsight Reports", evidence-based, single-agent reviews.

Abstracting and indexing 
Drugs is abstracted and indexed in:

According to the Journal Citation Reports it received an impact factor of 11.431, ranking it 2nd out of 94 journals in the category "Toxicology" and ranking it 13th out of 279 journals in the category "Pharmacology & Pharmacy"

References

External links 
 

Pharmacology journals
Toxicology journals
English-language journals
Publications established in 1971
Springer Science+Business Media academic journals